Young Americans Against Socialism (styled YAAS) is a 501(3)(c) nonprofit, launched August late 2019, which opposes socialism.

YAAS is led by Morgan Zegers, Peter Olson, and Christopher Zeller. The organization's board of advisers consists of Bill Montgomery (the founder of Turning Point USA), Jameson Campaigne (former Goldwater Girl), Gary Rabine, Jeff Christensen, and David Fonseca.

References

External links
https://www.yaas.org

Non-profit organizations based in the United States